Kumplampoika is a village in  Pathanamthitta district of Kerala, India.

History
Kumplampoika evolved out of "Kumbhi Ulavum Poika" which literally connotes the presence of "Kumbhi" (elephant) in the village until a few hundred years back.

Landmarks
There are three churches, temples, branches of major banks, library (Bodleian library, RegNo. 03 RNI 1797 affiliated by State Library council), co-operative societies, a retail market, and a vegetable market.

Transportation
Kumplampoika is 8  km equidistant from Pathanamthitta and Ranni.

Colleges
 MUSALIAR COLLEGE OF ARTS & SCIENCE, CHEENKALTHADOM, MALAYALAPPUZHA, PATHANAMTHITTA

Economy
The main contribution to the economy is in the form of remittance from NRIs and rubber plantations and other low scale farm cultivation.

References 

Villages in Pathanamthitta district